The "Great Four" are four hymns widely popular in Anglican and other Protestant churches during the 19th century.

In his Anglican Hymnology, published in 1885, the Rev. James King surveyed 52 hymnals from the member churches of the Anglican Communion around the world, and found that 51 of them included these hymns, the so-called Great Four:

All Praise to Thee, my God, this Night, text by Thomas Ken
Hark! The Herald Angels Sing, text by Charles Wesley
Lo! He Comes With Clouds Descending, text by Charles Wesley
Rock of Ages, Cleft for Me, text by Augustus Montague Toplady

King also found the following six hymns in 49 of the 52 hymnals:
Abide with Me, Fast Falls the Eventide, text by Henry Francis Lyte
Awake my Soul and With the Sun, text by Thomas Ken
<li>Jerusalem the Golden, text by Bernard of Cluny, English translation by John Mason Neale<li>

Jesus, Lover of My Soul, text by Charles Wesley
Sun of My Soul, Thou Savior Dear, text by John Keble
When I Survey the Wondrous Cross,  text by Isaac Watts

All of these hymns likewise appear in The Best Church Hymns, published by the Rev. Louis F. Benson in 1898.  Benson's collection of 32 frequently published hymns from various churches was based upon a survey of 107 Protestant hymnals, including King's book, thus representing "the judgment of our common Protestantism."

References

Anglicanism
English Christian hymns